Pointe de la Masse is a mountain of Savoie, France. It lies in the Massif de la Vanoise range. It has an elevation of 2,804 metres above sea level.

Mountains of the Alps
Mountains of Savoie